Theoris may refer to:

 Theoris, a vessel which the Athenians used to be sent annually to Delos. No death sentence was permitted to be executed before its return.
 Theoris of Lemnos, an ancient Greek woman who was accused of witchcraft. The evidence of her prosecution is the most detailed account of a witch trial to survive from Classical Greece.